is a passenger railway station in located in the town of Meiwa, Taki District, Mie Prefecture, Japan, operated by the private railway operator Kintetsu Railway.

Lines
Saikū Station is served by the Yamada Line, and is located 17.1 rail kilometers from the terminus of the line at Ise-Nakagawa Station.

Station layout
The station was consists of two opposed side platforms connected by a level crossing. The station is unattended.

Platforms

Adjacent stations

History
Saikū Station opened on March 27, 1930 as a station on the Sangu Kyuko Electric Railway. On March 15, 1941, the line merged with Osaka Electric Railway to become a station on Kansai Kyuko Railway's Yamada Line. This line in turn was merged with the Nankai Electric Railway on June 1, 1944 to form Kintetsu. A new station building was completed in 1944; this was replaced by a modern building in 1992.

Passenger statistics
In fiscal 2019, the station was used by an average of 850 passengers daily (boarding passengers only).

Surrounding area
Small-scale model of Saikū Palace, ancient home of the Saiō
Saikū Historical Museum
Meiwa Town Hall

References

External links

 Kintetsu: Saikū Station 

Railway stations in Japan opened in 1930
Railway stations in Mie Prefecture
Stations of Kintetsu Railway
Meiwa, Mie